Rhapsodies for Orchestra is a single-movement orchestral composition by the American composer Steven Stucky.  The work was jointly commissioned by the New York Philharmonic and the BBC for the Philharmonic's European tour in August and September 2008.  The piece had its world premiere August 28, 2008 in Royal Albert Hall at The Proms, with the New York Philharmonic performing under conductor Lorin Maazel.

Composition
In approaching Stucky with the commission for a new piece, Maazel suggested to Stucky that the composition be "something rhapsodic".  Stucky later wrote, "I ran to the dictionary for help. The more I thought about the words rhapsody and rhapsodic—words I would never have chosen to describe my music—the more I realized that boundaries are meant to be pushed, and that an external, even foreign stimulus like 'rhapsodic' could be just the ticket to push mine."  Stucky further described the composition in the score program notes, writing:

Reception
Reviewing the December 2011 Chicago premiere, music critic John von Rhein praised Rhapsodies for Orchestra, writing, "In a series of interlocking episodes, the solo flute, English horn, horn and trumpet found themselves echoed and mimicked by other instruments and groups. Swirls of orchestral color were infused with quirky rhythmic vitality. Van Zweden and the CSO brought the 10-minute piece to life most enjoyably."  Katie Womack of the Dallas Observer similarly praised the piece at its Dallas premiere, commenting, "The dynamics of this piece range from intimate to bombastic and the juxtaposition of those extremes created some stunning sounds in the Meyerson. At only ten minutes, Stucky's Rhapsodies left me wanting more."  Anthony Tommasini of The New York Times also lauded the work, remarking:

Jeffrey Gantz of The Boston Globe was more critical, describing the piece as "a series of ecstatic outbursts in which one instrument essays an idea and others take it up."  Gantz added that it "worked out better in theory than in practice, though I liked the section in which the viola crooned over the orchestra’s 12-note ostinato."  Likewise, Lawrence A. Johnson of the Chicago Classical Review called it "not one of Stucky’s more essential pieces" and noted that "Stucky’s debt to Witold Lutosławski [was] at times glaringly evident."  Music critic Carla Rees similarly opined:

References

Compositions by Steven Stucky
2008 compositions
21st-century classical music
Rhapsodies
Compositions for symphony orchestra
Music commissioned by the BBC
Music commissioned by the New York Philharmonic